Châtillon-Saint-Jean (Vivaro-Alpine: Chastilhon e Sent Joan) is a commune in the Drôme department in southeastern France.

Population

See also
Communes of the Drôme department

References

Communes of Drôme